is a 2014 action role-playing game developed by FromSoftware and published by Bandai Namco Games. An entry in the Dark Souls series, it was released for Windows, PlayStation 3, and Xbox 360. Taking place in the kingdom of Drangleic, the game features both player versus environment (PvE) and player versus player (PvP) gameplay. Dark Souls II was released in March 2014 after some initial delays, with the Windows version being released the following month.

Dark Souls II was a critical and commercial success. A remastered version of the game, titled Dark Souls II: Scholar of the First Sin, was released for PlayStation 3, PlayStation 4, Xbox 360, Xbox One, and Windows in April 2015. It contains the original game and its downloadable content with upgraded graphics, expanded online multiplayer capacity, and various other changes. A sequel, Dark Souls III, was released in 2016.

Gameplay
Dark Souls II is an entry in the Dark Souls series, known for its difficulty, as both bosses and standard enemies have the potential to defeat the player in only a few hits. Bad play is punished severely by most enemies, opportunities for recovering health are limited, with each death the player's maximum health is reduced. This is called hollowing and only drops to a set lower limit until the player expends a rare item to reverse it.The game uses a form of joint currency called "souls", which are used as both experience points for leveling up and also as currency for purchasing items from shops. Upon death, the player's entire collection of souls are dropped; the player can recover their dropped souls by returning to the spot where they died, but if they die before picking them up, the souls are permanently lost.

Multiplayer in Dark Souls II uses the same format as its predecessors; players have the choice between co-operative play in the form of being "summoned" into another player's game world either by soapstone or in-game covenant, or player-versus-player through "invading" other worlds or arena duels. Both forms of multiplayer occur pseudo-randomly, although matchmaking formulas are used to pair characters at similar levels together.

The game allows its difficulty to be adjusted by mechanics built into the game.  The game designers placed certain items early in the game allowing newer players higher basic damage and defense than they would normally have at that point.  For more experienced players, the designers placed higher skill cap items early that do more damage if executed correctly. Other penalties, such as the health reduction on death, can be significantly reduced with certain items.  This allows the player to set the game's difficulty based on their experiences with the game, rather than through a menu option. Dark Souls II features a new game plus mode. With each replay, the player retains their levels, souls, and most items.

Plot
The story of Dark Souls II begins with a human who has become Undead, cursed to never die and doomed to eventually become a Hollow, a zombie-like being with no memories or purpose. The protagonist is also known as the Bearer of the Curse. To break the curse, the undead travels to the fallen kingdom of Drangleic and is tasked by the Emerald Herald with obtaining four Great Souls from powerful Old Ones whose names are long forgotten and forbidden. Once obtained, the Emerald Herald directs the undead to "Seek the King" in the capital.  After fighting through the remains of the royal guards, the player encounters the Queen Nashandra, who reveals that the king failed in his duty and fled his kingdom long ago. She asks the protagonist to slay the king.

Near the end of the Queen's quest, the player learns that the ruin of the kingdom was in fact caused by Nashandra.  She came to the king and deceived him into launching an ill-fated invasion across the sea into the lands of the Giants.  She coveted their souls and sought to steal their power.  Though the raid succeeded in stealing the Giant's unspecified power, the Giants retaliated.  Invading Drangleic, the Giants eventually destroyed the kingdom.  With his kingdom in ruins, the king discovered Nashandra's true purpose and locked himself inside the Undead Crypt.

In order to confront Nashandra, the player character travels to the keep of Aldia, the King's brother, to obtain the Ashen Mist Heart, an artifact that allows a form of time travel, by accessing the "memories" of corpses. The player must enter the memories of a deceased Giant to defeat the Giant Lord during the invasion and claim his power for their own. Confronting the Emerald Herald one final time, she states that Nashandra is a fragment of Manus, the final boss in the Artorias of the Abyss expansion in Dark Souls. She then asks the protagonist to put Nashandra to rest and to take the Throne of Want.

In the Scholar of the First Sin version of the game, the base story changes slightly, notably with the addition of Aldia after the defeat of Nashandra. If the player has defeated King Vendrick, Aldia attempts to help the protagonist understand that there might be a way out of the endless cycle of death and rebirth. The player is given a choice: they can either take the throne, thus allowing the cycle of Age of Fire and Dark to continue; or the player can abscond the throne, resisting the effects of Hollowing and following their own unknown path beyond light or dark.

Development
Dark Souls II was announced at the Spike Video Game Awards on December 7, 2012. Hidetaka Miyazaki, who served as the director on Dark Souls, acted as a supervisor, while the game was directed by Tomohiro Shibuya and Yui Tanimura.

Dark Souls II features gameplay mechanics similar to its predecessor; Shibuya stated that he had no intention of changing the controls. The game features a whole new world, with many weapons that are used to fight the monsters in the game. Covenants, a feature in the original Dark Souls, that allowed the player to align with different factions, make a reappearance, though it is easier to understand and more accessible. The game world is roughly the same size as in Dark Souls, though content density is much richer, and gives players more freedom in how to progress, with the beginning of the game more accessible to newcomers. The game retains the challenging gameplay characteristic of the original, as Tanimura explained: "We do not plan on having an Easy Mode since we are creating this game with a thought that challenge and difficulty are core elements of the game."

The development team utilized a more powerful graphics engine for the sequel. New challenges, adding to the series' documented difficulty level, were also added. The game features a more advanced AI system, that allows enemies to react to a wider range of actions by the player. In September 2013, an announcement regarding the delay of the PC version was made by Tanimura who said it was necessary to ensure it was optimal.

Additional content

Bandai Namco Games producer Takeshi Miyazoe originally stated in December 2013 that he did not expect there to be downloadable content (DLC) for Dark Souls II. Despite that, in an interview in January 2014, he said that there is definitely potential for DLC for the game and that fan feedback is key. On June 4, 2014, FromSoftware announced a trilogy of DLC collectively known as The Lost Crowns. The first of these, titled Crown of the Sunken King, was released on July 22, 2014. The second, Crown of the Old Iron King, was released on August 26, 2014. The final DLC, Crown of the Ivory King, was slated to be released on September 24, 2014, but was delayed until September 30, 2014.

Scholar of the First Sin
On November 25, 2014, Bandai Namco Games announced an updated version of the game, Dark Souls II: Scholar of the First Sin, which was released on April 1, 2015, for PC, PlayStation 3, and Xbox 360, along with PlayStation 4 and Xbox One. On all platforms, the game is a compilation of Dark Souls II and its three DLC campaigns. On PC, PlayStation 4 and Xbox One, Scholar of the First Sin also features remastered visuals with more advanced lighting effects, running at 1080p resolution at 60 frames per second. The re-release also makes changes to the game itself; enemy positions and behaviors have been revised, and the game also supports up to six players in multiplayer scenarios. Its release coincided with patch version 1.10, which was also released for existing versions of the game on February 5, 2015. The update included improvements to online play, the addition of the titular Scholar of the First Sin NPC, performance improvements, and adjustments to items and covenants among other changes. Despite these improvements, the update did not fix the long-standing frame rate-dependent weapon degradation bug, which was later fixed in a patch released in April 2015.

The existing PC version of Dark Souls II received the 1.10 patch at no charge; the remastered Scholar of the First Sin edition must be purchased separately, but is available at a discount to existing Dark Souls II owners. The remastered version uses DirectX 11 instead of 9, and save data from the original version is incompatible with it.

Reception

Dark Souls II received universal acclaim, according to review aggregator Metacritic. Critics praised the game's atmosphere, and visuals in the game, seeing it as a large improvement over the first two installments in the series, but were polarized over the game's increased difficulty. Famitsu reviewed the game with four reviewers giving their opinions, who gave it 9/10/9/9, bringing the total score to 37/40. IGNs critic Marty Sliva gave the game a score of 9/10: "Dark Souls II is a smart, massive, and incredibly rewarding sequel. It’s crammed with deep systems, tense encounters, and enough clever multiplayer and New Game Plus elements to make me want to restart the second I saw the end credits. Not all of the tweaks and additions worked out for the best, the penalty for dying made the game almost unplayable but with such great enemies and levels to fight and explore, Dark Souls II made 60 hours of pain and agony so much fun they flew by in a heartbeat." Daniel Tack of Game Informer gave the game a 9.75 out of 10, stating: "Dark Souls II is an epic adventure from start to finish packed with wondrous environments, imaginative and terrifying foes, and the continual adrenaline-apprehension rush of passing through each fog gate makes this title a must-play." Polygons Phil Kollar also gave it a 9/10, and similarly praised the ambition displayed by the team in creating such a vast RPG universe for the player to explore, the notorious difficulty, and the sense of triumph that comes with eventually defeating the game; he notes that his character died 235 times before completing it. Despite the universal praise, the game was criticized by some reviewers for aspects relating to its unyielding difficulty and its divergence from its predecessors resulting from the change of directors, and is often considered the black sheep of the series.

Sales
A few weeks after release, the game had shipped over a million copies within the United States and Europe. A year after release, the game had sold over 2.5 million copies worldwide. The game also won the Game of the Year award at the 2014 Golden Joystick Awards.

Notes

References

External links

 

2014 video games
Action role-playing video games
Dark fantasy video games
Video games about death
FromSoftware games
Multiplayer and single-player video games
Bandai Namco games
PlayStation 3 games
PlayStation 4 games
Video game sequels
Video games scored by Motoi Sakuraba
Video games developed in Japan
Video games featuring protagonists of selectable gender
Video games with alternate endings
Video games with downloadable content
Windows games
Xbox 360 games
Xbox One games
Video games using Havok
Open-world video games
Dark fantasy role-playing video games
Soulslike video games
Golden Joystick Award for Game of the Year winners
Dark Souls